Ntsopa Mokoena (born 17 August 2004) is a field hockey player from South Africa, who plays as a forward.

Personal life
Ntsopa Mokoena was born and raised in the Free State city of Bethlehem.

She is a former student of Bethlehem Voortrekker Hoërskool.

Career

Senior national team
Mokoena received her first call up to the national team during a tour to Spain in December 2022. She made her debut during a test series against Italy, and followed this up with an appearance at the inaugural FIH Nations Cup.

Under–21
Mokoena made her debut for the South Africa U–21 in 2023 at the Junior Africa Cup in Ismailia.

International goals

References

External links

2004 births
Living people
South African female field hockey players
Female field hockey forwards
21st-century South African women
South African Sotho people